Ordaghan (also Romanized as Ordaghān and Ardaghān) is a village in Milanlu Rural District, in the Central District of Esfarayen County, North Khorasan Province, Iran. At the 2006 census, its population was 637, in 142 families.

References 

Populated places in Esfarayen County